A reprisal is a limited violation in the laws of war to punish the enemy for committing an unprovoked violation. Reprisal may also refer to:
Reprisal (novel), a novel by F. Paul Wilson
 Reprisal!, a 1956 American film directed by George Sherman
Reprisal (film), a 2018 American thriller film
Reprisal (TV series), a Hulu TV series starting in 2019
Reprisal operations (Israel), raids carried out by Israel in the 1950s and 1960s in response to fedayeen infiltration attacks

See also
Retaliation (disambiguation)
Retribution (disambiguation)